John Gibbon (born in Philadelphia on February 12, 1934) was a Psychology professor at Columbia University. He was the son of John Heysham Gibbon. His contributions to scalar timing (1971) and scalar expectancy theory (1977) are considering major theoretical contributions. Together with Russell Church and Warren Meck he published the scalar timing model (1984). He died in Ossining, New York on January 16, 2001.

References 

1934 births
2001 deaths